Sanjay Singh is an Indian politician elected to the Haryana Legislative Assembly from Sohna in the 2019 Haryana Legislative Assembly election as a member of the Bharatiya Janata Party.

Personal life
Singh is son of former minister Surajpal Singh and an agriculturist by profession. He graduated from Maharshi Dayanand University, Rohtak, in Bachelor of Arts in 1997.

References 

1970s births
Living people
Bharatiya Janata Party politicians from Haryana
People from Rohtak district
Haryana MLAs 2019–2024
Year of birth missing (living people)
Indian Hindus